The 2017 Leitrim Senior Football Championship was the 111th edition of Leitrim GAA's premier gaelic football tournament for senior clubs in County Leitrim, Ireland. The tournament consists of 12 teams, with the winner going on to represent Leitrim in the Connacht Senior Club Football Championship. The championship starts with a group stage and then progresses to a knock out stage.

Aughawillan were the defending champions after they defeated Glencar–Manorhamilton in the previous years final.

Ballinamore Seán O'Heslin's made a return to the senior grade after 4 seasons in the Intermediate grade by winning the 2016 Leitrim Intermediate Football Championship.

Annaduff were relegated to the 2018 I.F.C. after losing the relegation final. They spent 16 years in the top-flight.

Team changes 

The following teams have changed division since the 2016 championship season.

To S.F.C. 
Promoted from 2016 Leitrim Intermediate Football Championship
 Ballinamore Seán O'Heslin's – (Intermediate Champions)

From S.F.C. 
Relegated to 2017 Leitrim Intermediate Football Championship
 Kiltubrid

Group stage 
All 12 teams enter the competition at this stage. The top 4 teams in both groups proceed to the quarter-finals. The 5th and 6th placed teams in each group will enter a Relegation Playoff.

Group A 

Round 1
 Mohill 1-20, 1-9 Aughawillan, 28/7/2017,
 Melvin Gaels 1-16, 0-7 Gortlettragh, 29/7/2017,
 Ballinamore Seán O'Heslin's 2-16, 1-8 Allen Gaels, 30/7/2017,

Round 2
 Ballinamore Seán O'Heslin's 3-20, 0-10 Gortlettragh, 4/8/2017,
 Aughawillan 2-13, 0-7 Allen Gaels, 5/8/2017,
 Mohill 0-14, 1-6 Melvin Gaels, 5/8/2017,

Round 3
 Ballinamore Seán O'Heslin's 3-11, 0-13 Aughawillan, 11/8/2017, Report
 Mohill 0-12, 0-6 Gortlettragh, 12/8/2016, Report
 Melvin Gaels 1-12, 1-5 Allen Gaels, 12/8/2017, Report

Round 4
 Gortlettragh 2-8, 0-3 Allen Gaels, 25/8/2017, Report
 Aughawillan 2-18, 2-14 Melvin Gaels 26/8/2017,
 Ballinamore Seán O'Heslin's 1-14, 0-12 Mohill, 26/8/2017, Report

Round 5
 Ballinamore Seán O'Heslin's 2-13, 0-12 Melvin Gaels, 2/9/2017,
 Mohill 0-21, 2-4 Allen Gaels, 2/9/2017,
 Aughawillan 4-13, 0-11 Gortlettragh, 2/9/2017,

Group B 

Round 1
 Annaduff 2-14, 0-11 Bornacoola, 29/7/2017,
 St. Mary's Kiltoghert 2-14, 0-7 Drumreilly, 29/7/2017,
 Glencar–Manorhamilton 2-22, 2-7 St. Patrick's Dromahair, 30/7/2017,

Round 2
 St. Mary's Kiltoghert 2-16, 0-9 Bornacoola, 5/8/2017,
 Glencar–Manorhamilton 1-13, 1-11 Annaduff, 5/8/2017,
 Drumreilly 2-11, 1-9 St. Patrick's Dromahair, 5/8/2017,

Round 3
 Bornacoola 2-11, 0-13 Glencar–Manorhamilton, 12/8/2017,Report
 St. Mary's Kiltoghert 4-17, 1-3 St. Patrick's Dromahair, 12/8/2017, Report
 Drumreilly 3-10, 2-10 Annaduff, 12/8/2017, Report

Round 4
 Glencar–Manorhamilton 3-22, 2-8 Drumreilly, 26/8/2017, Report
 Annaduff 1-16, 2-10 St. Mary's Kiltoghert, 26/8/2017, Report
 St. Patrick's Dromahair 2-11, 0-14 Bornacoola, 26/8/2017, Report

Round 5
 Drumreilly 2-10, 1-7 Bornacoola, 2/9/2017,
 St. Patrick's Dromahair 3-13, 0-10 Annaduff, 2/9/2017,
 St. Mary's Kiltoghert 0-10, 0-10 Glencar–Manorhamilton, 2/9/2017,

Knock-Out Stage

Quarter-finals

Semi-finals

Final

Relegation Playoffs 
Relegation Semi-Finals
 Gortletteragh 1-12, 1-9 Bornacoola, Carrigallen, 9/9/2017,
 Allen Gaels 1-8, 1-5 Annaduff, 10/9/2017,

Relegation Final
 Bornacoola 2-12, 2-10 Annaduff, Cloone, 24/9/2017,

Connacht Senior Club Football Championship

References 

Leitrim Senior Football Championship
Leitrim Senior Football Championship